Carlos Suárez García-Osorio (born May 23, 1986) is a Spanish professional basketball player for Unicaja of the Liga ACB. He is a 2.03 m (6 ft 8 in) tall small forward.

Professional career
Carlos Suárez joined the Liga ACB club Estudiantes's senior team during the 2005, rising from club's junior team ranks.

In September 2010, he signed a four-year contract with Real Madrid. With Madrid, Suárez won the Liga ACB in the 2013 season, and the Spanish Cup and Supercup in 2012.

In August 2013, Suárez signed a 1+1 year contract with Unicaja. In February 2015, he extended his contract for 2 more seasons.

In the 2016–17 season, Suárez won the EuroCup with Unicaja after beating Valencia Basket in the Finals. He signed a two-year contract extension on June 14, 2020.

Spain national team
In July 2010, Suárez played for first time with the senior Spain national team, but did not make the final 12-man roster for 2010 FIBA World Championship.

Awards and accomplishments
EuroCup: 2016–17
Copa del Rey: 2012
Supercopa de España: 2012
Liga ACB: 2012–13

Individual awards
 ACB Rising Star Award: 2005–06
 All-ACB Team: 2009–10

References

External links
 Carlos Suárez at acb.com 
 Carlos Suárez at draftexpress.com
 Carlos Suárez at euroleague.net
 Carlos Suárez at fiba.com

1986 births
Living people
Baloncesto Málaga players
Basketball players from Madrid
CB Estudiantes players
Liga ACB players
Power forwards (basketball)
Real Madrid Baloncesto players
Spanish men's basketball players